Big Nate: On a Roll is a realistic fiction novel  by American cartoonist Lincoln Peirce, based on the comic strip Big Nate. It is the third book in the Big Nate novel series, followed by Big Nate Goes for Broke, released on August 16, 2011. It is aimed at children aged 8 to 12. It was published by HarperCollins Publishers in New York City.

Plot
Nate Wright is in detention, as earlier his art teacher Mr. Rosa asks him to hold a ladder for his rival Artur, so that he can paint the scenery for the school play. He recalls Artur dripping paint on him and Mr. Rosa getting mad at Nate for letting go of the ladder and giving him detention. When detention is over, Nate tries to get to his Timber scout troop meeting which is held in his best friend Teddy's house on his skateboard, but on his way, he accidentally crashes into a woman's poodle's stretched leash, causing his skateboard to roll off the bridge and impact in oily water below. This results in Nate having to walk, causing him to miss the meeting. Francis and Teddy tell him that Artur has joined their scout troop, much to Nate's horror. Nate's anger only increases when he realizes that the last of Mrs. Ortiz's chocolate chip cookies that Nate really loves was eaten by Artur. Artur offers to give Nate and Francis rides home in his mother's car, but Nate wants to walk, and Francis decides to accompany him. As the two are walking home, Francis talks to Nate about the fundraiser where they have to sell Warm Fuzzies, wall hangings with little statements underneath (which Nate says are horrible), as they need money for their camping gear. When Nate finds out that the grand prize is a new skateboard, he becomes motivated to sell Warm Fuzzies.

The next day, Nate meets Teddy and Francis at his mailbox, where Francis tells Nate that Artur's his competition. At school, Nate sees Artur and Gina sucking up to the teachers, and Nate says that they're made for each other, which gives Nate the idea to make a plan to have Gina and Artur fall for one another so he can go after Jenny, Artur’s current girlfriend, who Nate has had a crush on since Kindergarten. Nate opens his locker, daydreaming that he will "Sweep Jenny off her feet" when random junk flies out leaving Nate on his back, which makes him a laughingstock. Jenny sees what happens and calls Nate a slob while Artur suggests that if Nate cleans his locker, it will not be messy, which annoys Nate. Later, during the last period of school, Science, his mind wanders to the prize skateboard and he starts doodling in his notebook. Gina peers over his shoulder and tells Mr. Galvin that Nate was drawing. Mr. Galvin lets Nate off the hook "for a fellow Timber scout". After school, Nate tries to get Artur to like Gina by mentioning that she is smart. Artur soon says goodbye and mentioned that he would spend the afternoon sailing, which makes Nate realize that he could get a head-start selling wall hangings.  As he is trying to sell some, he heads to his next-door neighbor Mr. Eustis's house, where he is jumped on by Spitsy, Mr. Eustis's moronic dog. Mr. Eustis apologizes and buys a warm fuzzy. After a couple of hours of trying to sell wall-hangings he has managed to sell five. When Nate gets home, he is shocked to find Artur in his uniform talking to his dad, Marty. He confronts Artur, only to realize that he mispronounced the word "selling" and pronounced it "sailing". After talking a bit longer, he finds out that Artur has sold twenty wall hangings. After talking to Artur, he goes into his house and sees that Artur felt bad for Nate and baked him brownies which Nate thinks is obnoxious. Nate's excited to see the opening night of the Peter Pan play put on by the Drama Club. He mentions that he is excited to check it out because Francis and Teddy were going, and he had only seen Peter Pan before once in his life. An hour later he meets up with Francis and Teddy, and Francis mentions that the tickets are sold out. Teddy remembers about the wall-hangings and asks about how many wall-hangings they have sold yet. Nate answers five which Francis thinks was good. Then Nate says "Not as good as Artur" and mentioned that he already sold twenty. Francis and Teddy are clearly shocked, and Nate said that winning the skateboard was going to be harder than he thought. Francis mentions that Nate already had a good skateboard. Nate mentions the whole "crashing into a poodle leash" incident and Francis and Teddy burst into laughter. When they get to P.S. 38, it is crowded. When Nate grabs some programs, he sees Jenny standing alone. He thinks that his plan has worked and goes over to say hi to Jenny when Artur comes in and takes Jenny. Nate is disappointed and then realizes that Artur was wearing his scout uniform and wonders why. The play starts and Nate gets into his seat next to Francis and Teddy. At intermission, they walk out of the theater to get some snacks. But Nate "almost loses his appetite" when he sees Artur selling the wall-hangings to theater-goers. Annoyed that he didn't think of it, he spends the rest of the night making up poems that mock Artur. When Nate gets home, he tries to sell some wall hangings to his big sister Ellen, but it backfires when Nate predicted that Ellen would buy 50 wall hangings. After Ellen screams at Nate for trying to make her buy 50 wall hangings which could be decreasing her money, she gives Nate an idea (without knowing it) which is him earning money by doing basic jobs, and then using it all to buy wall hangings, instead of selling wall hangings, because he mentioned earlier in the book that everyone always rejects his offers.

The next morning on Saturday, he finds Mr. Eustis with a sprained knee, and he needs help to walk Spitsy while he recovers. Nate takes the job, but it turns out terrible. He flashes back to the walk, where Spitsy and him were heading to the park. Mr. Eustis also mentioned Spitsy as unpredictable, and Nate explains that Spitsy keeps zigzagging all over the place every time Nate takes Spitsy for a walk (and a couple times Spitsy yanked the leash out of Nate's hand.), so Nate decides to tie Spitsy's leash to his belt. Nate is distracted by thinking of a name for his invention, while Spitsy sees Pickles (Francis's cat whom he loves for some strange reason) and dashes for her, leaving Nate out of control with his invention and smashing his face on a tree. Nate gets a black eye and some bruises. He eventually finds Spitsy with Pickles, but when his dad sees Nate's injuries, he drives him to the emergency room. His doctor says to Nate's dad for Nate to rest for the day. Nate wakes up early the next morning to let people in his neighborhood know about his business by making little cards and drawing little pictures of him doing work and sticking them in almost everyone's property around the neighborhood. He gets lots of jobs and earns almost 50 dollars, but he has a job that involved moving lawn gnomes to their name signs (for help Nate had to turn the gnomes over and find its name) and Nate would get 25 dollars if he finished the job. One acquaintance Nate has is named Kevin, and he is on his way to a Peter Pan show and is playing the part of Captain Hook. Nate finds a sword on Kevin (which is just wood and silver paint) and asks if he can use it, and Kevin gives it to him. However, when Nate is acting like Captain Hook, he swings the sword at a lawn gnome and without even knowing and decapitates one of the lawn gnome, which results in the owner of the gnomes firing him from his job, and then Nate not getting his 25 dollars.

On Monday morning, Nate finds hope to raise more money as he sees The Math Olympiad roster, and Artur is on the list, and Nate later finds out that the Math Olympiad lasts for 2 days on the next weekend, which gives him plenty of time to catch up to Artur. Then after that, Nate tries to trick Artur into falling in love with Gina (since Gina is also on the roster too). He walks into Social Studies class now, but when he is getting to his desk, Mrs. Godfrey screams at him for his mediocre homework and tells Nate to rewrite it without the cartoons. That suddenly gives Nate an idea to sell cartoons rather than sell wall hangings. After school, he quickly gets home and puts together "Nate's Comix Crack Up", a compilation of comics written by Nate. Then he makes 20 copies of the comic (it only took 33 dollars and 92 cents which is almost all the money he got over the weekend). He then goes to the mall to ask Ellen's boyfriend Gordie, who runs a comic book shop, if he wants to sell a copy of his comic book. Gordie accepts the offer to put it on display, but he has to get his boss's okay to do that. Meanwhile, Nate finds a guy who is putting comic books in his bag and mistakes him for a shoplifter, for he is actually Gordie's boss. This ends up with Gordie buying one copy but telling Nate he should sell the other copies somewhere else. Nate finds some potential customers, but they all say no, and when Nate reads one of the comics to one of them, they state that his comics aren't funny. Nate then gets an idea to speak on the intercom, which attracts only the mall cop who chews out Nate, and then his dad hears the news and grounds him for a week.

The next morning, Nate's dad says that Nate is no longer grounded, but is provided to make it through school with no incidents. Nate quickly goes to school, but later finds out that the school is laughing out loud to a rumor that Nate likes Gina. He finds out later that Artur made the rumor because he thought Nate would want her for himself. At that moment, Nate is almost late for social studies, and he knows that is definitely an incident. He is on his way to class when he encounters Mrs. Hickson, the librarian, and tells Nate that Artur left his Warm Fuzzies form at BBC (Breakfast Book Club). Nate studies the form and finds out that Artur made 424 dollars after adding the money all up. He gets to class and give Artur his order form, then ends the "Nate likes Gina" rumors. He has some really close calls during some periods, but he eventually made it through school without no incidents. He then studies what money he got from every job he did, and he comes up with a total of $109.08, but it still isn't  enough to beat Artur, as he has to earn over 300 dollars by Thursday to meet his goal. He then meets up with Gordie, who is reading a price guide which lists the cash of collectible comic books and Nate is seemingly surprised and asks Gordie if he can borrow it, and Gordie says yes. Nate then runs home and opens his closet.

On Thursday, at a troop meeting, the scouts hand their order forms to Teddy's dad, who is their troop leader. Artur then goes with his mom in her car, then Nate states that Artur might have some competition, and tells the whole story. When Nate saw the price guide on one of the comics, he remembered that he bought the exact same comic at a yard sale last fall, and he thought it was worthless, so he threw it in his messy closet. Despite its lack of printing, the comic book turns out to be a collector’s item (technically a thousand dollars). He found the exact same book in his closet and sold it to Gordie, and he bought it (although some pages were ripped or smeared with Cheez Doodle stains).

At the jamboree Teddy's dad announced on Saturday, the scoutmaster announces the prize winners. When he gets to the first prize, he announces that both Nate and Artur have sold 58 wall hangings. The scoutmaster does a coin flip to determine who will be the winner. Nate wins and receives the skateboard, and Artur wins the telescope, Artur invites Nate's friends to watch him set up his telescope, but Nate puts on his skateboard gear and in response, begins to ride his new skateboard to Artur's house.

Characters

These characters appear in the book:
	
Nate Wright - The main protagonist, a boy who believes he is destined for greatness. He is constantly getting detention for standing up to Mrs. Godfrey, a teacher who Nate thinks “is out to get him.” He likes to draw comics featuring him as a superhero and has a crush on a girl named Jenny.
Francis Pope - Nate's highly intelligent best friend. 	
Teddy Ortiz - Nate's comedic best friend who 	
Ellen Wright - Nate's older sister, a girly and boy-crazy teen who annoys Nate.
Gordie - Ellen's boyfriend. He works at the comics store, Klassic Komix, where Nate tried to sell his comic book, Nate's Komix Krack-Up, but was unsuccessful.
Don Eustis - Nate's middle-aged bachelor neighbour, who owns the idiotic and pathetic dog, Spitsy. In the book, he plays a minor role; asking Nate to walk Spitsy.
Spitsy - The moronic and pathetic pet dog of Nate's next-door neighbour, Mr. Eustis. In the book, like his owner, he plays a minor role, where Nate agrees to walk him, causing him serious pain.
Jenny Jenkins - Nate's crush and Artur's girlfriend. She thinks Nate is annoying but loves Artur, and sometimes hits Nate when he tries to flirt with her.
Gina Hemphill-Toms - Nate's other nemesis who has a very high IQ and brags about it. Nate and Gina hate each other and they are both mad when Artur says that Nate has a crush on Gina.

Reception
The book has received positive acclaim. School Library Journal praised the book that the main character Nate "delivers what fans come to expect", and Kirkus Reviews called the book the "slickest of the series". As of September 2020, 95% of google users liked the book. The book website Goodreads.com rated it a 4.4/5. The online bookstore Barnes & Noble rated it 4.2/5. A critic from Common Sense Media said that it was "sure to entice reluctant readers with its funny blend of misadventures and comic-style art."

References
 	

2011 American novels
American children's novels
2011 children's books
Big Nate
HarperCollins books